Nawala West Grama Niladhari Division is a Grama Niladhari Division of the Sri Jayawardanapura Kotte Divisional Secretariat of Colombo District of Western Province, Sri Lanka. It has Grama Niladhari Division Code 520.

Nawala are located within, nearby or associated with Nawala West.

Nawala West is a surrounded by the Koswatta, Nawala East, Narahenpita, Nugegoda West, Kirula, Gothamipura and Welikada North Grama Niladhari Divisions.

Demographics

Ethnicity 

The Nawala West Grama Niladhari Division has a Sinhalese majority (87.7%). In comparison, the Sri Jayawardanapura Kotte Divisional Secretariat (which contains the Nawala West Grama Niladhari Division) has a Sinhalese majority (84.8%)

Religion 

The Nawala West Grama Niladhari Division has a Buddhist majority (77.7%). In comparison, the Sri Jayawardanapura Kotte Divisional Secretariat (which contains the Nawala West Grama Niladhari Division) has a Buddhist majority (77.1%)

Gallery

References 

Grama Niladhari Divisions of Kotte Divisional Secretariat